Ashotavan is a village in the Sisian Municipality of the Syunik Province in Armenia.

Etymology 
The village was previously known as Aghk’end, T’azak’end, Khnok and Kirakosik.

Demographics 
The Statistical Committee of Armenia reported its population as 647 in 2010, up from 623 at the 2001 census.

Gallery

References 

Populated places in Syunik Province